Tomas Sinisalo (born January 15, 1986) is an American-born Finnish professional ice hockey forward who currently is the head coach of and plays for Oulunkylän Kiekko-Kerho of the Finnish 2. Divisioona. He is the son of former National Hockey League (NHL) player Ilkka Sinisalo, and was born in Philadelphia when his father was a member of the Flyers.

References

External links

1986 births
Espoo Blues players
Finnish ice hockey forwards
Green Bay Gamblers players
HC TPS players
Ice hockey coaches from Pennsylvania
KalPa players
Kiekko-Vantaa players
Living people
Malmö Redhawks players
SaiPa players
Sportspeople from Philadelphia
Ice hockey players from Pennsylvania